José David Portillo (born 24 November 1984) is a Paraguayan footballer.

Honours

Club
Antofagasta
 Primera B: 2011

External links
 
 

1984 births
Living people
Paraguayan footballers
Paraguayan expatriate footballers
Sportivo Trinidense footballers
C.D. Antofagasta footballers
Deportes Copiapó footballers
Cobresal footballers
Primera B de Chile players
Chilean Primera División players
Expatriate footballers in Chile
Association football defenders